Dale Farley is a retired professional American football player who played linebacker for the Buffalo Bills and Miami Dolphins.

References

1949 births
American football linebackers
Buffalo Bills players
Miami Dolphins players
West Virginia Mountaineers football players
Living people
People from Sparta, Tennessee